Ephraim Knight Smart (September 3, 1813 – September 29, 1872) was a United States representative from Maine.

Early life
Smart was born in Prospect, Massachusetts) on September 3, 1813. He attended the common schools, completed preparatory studies under private tutors, and attended Maine Wesleyan Seminary. He studied law, was admitted to the bar and commenced practice in Camden.

Career
Smart was appointed postmaster in Camden in 1838. He was elected a member of the Maine State Senate. He was appointed aide-de-camp with the rank of lieutenant colonel on the staff of Governor Fairfield in 1842. Smart moved to Missouri in 1843 and continued the practice of his profession. He returned to Camden the following year, resumed the practice of law, and was again appointed postmaster. He was elected as a Democrat to the Thirtieth Congress (March 4, 1847 – March 3, 1849) and to the Thirty-second Congress (March 4, 1851 – March 3, 1853).

After retirement, he served as collector of customs at Belfast 1853-1858. He established the Maine Free Press in 1854, and served as editor for three years. He was elected a member of the Maine House of Representatives in 1858, and was an unsuccessful candidate for Governor of Maine in 1860. He again served in the State Senate, moved to Biddeford and established the Maine Democrat.

Death
Smart died in Camden on September 29, 1872. He was interred at Mountain Street Cemetery.

References

External links
Incorporates information from the public domain website of the Bioguide of the US Congress
 

1813 births
1872 deaths
Democratic Party Maine state senators
People from Camden, Maine
People from Prospect, Maine
Democratic Party members of the United States House of Representatives from Maine
19th-century American politicians
Kents Hill School alumni